''See Peter of Pisa for namesake

Pietro Gambacorta (15 February 1355 - 17 June 1435) was an Italian Roman Catholic priest and the co-founder of the Poor Hermits of St. Jerome. He was a professed religious from the Third Order of Saint Francis and co-founded his order in Rome alongside Nicola da Forca Palena.

Pope Innocent XII beatified him on 9 November 1693.

Life

Pietro Gambacorta was born in the Republic of Pisa in 1355, the son of a government official and the brother of Chiara Gambacorti. His brothers were Lorenzo and Benedetto. His father and brothers were all killed on 21 October 1392.

At age 22, he experienced a sudden conversion and decided to become a beggar. In 1380, he left home in favor of leading a life of begging and one of hermitage on Monte Cessano in the Umbria province, while also becoming a professed member of the Third Order of Saint Francis. He once converted a band of thieves to the faith and also rallied them to his life of hermitage, which laid the foundations to the Poor Hermits of Saint Jerome that he himself designed. These twelve thieves repented when they saw his austerity and piety. Pope Urban VI approved the rule for his hermitage while he was in Umbria. He co-established the order in Rome on a visit alongside Nicola da Forca Palena. The order received initial approval from Pope Martin V in 1420 and received full approval from Pope Eugene IV in 1446.

He died on 17 June 1435, and his order was later dissolved under Pope Pius XI in 1933. His remains are housed in the church of Saint Jerome in Venice.

Beatification
Pope Innocent XII beatified him on 9 November 1693.

References

External links
Saints SQPN
Roman-Catholic-Saints
The Franciscan Book of Saints, Marion A. Habig, Friars Minor (O.F.M.)

1355 births
1435 deaths
14th-century venerated Christians
14th-century Italian Roman Catholic priests
15th-century venerated Christians
15th-century Italian Roman Catholic priests
Beatifications by Pope Innocent XII
Franciscan hermits
Franciscan beatified people
Founders of Catholic religious communities
Italian beatified people
Members of the Third Order of Saint Francis
Venerated Catholics